Libero Burro is a 1999  Italian comedy film. The film marked the debut as director and screenwriter of Sergio Castellitto.  It premiered, out of competition, at 56th Venice Film Festival. The film won the Grand Prix at the Mons International Film Festival.

Plot  
Libero Burro is a man of southern origin, with no property and idle, who has decided to pursue a career as a manager in Turin. He decides to take a gamble and tries to grab La Cavallerizza, a central building owned by his friend Marione, horse player and father of the fascinating Rosa. Libero, who has no qualifications, enrolled in evening schools, attended by non-EU citizens, to obtain a surveyor's diploma. On this occasion he meets Caterina, an Italian teacher, with whom he falls in love. But a businessman, Gaetano Novaro, a graduate, opposes him in every way and life becomes difficult for Libero. Libero is no longer able to manage events, and decides to focus on more affordable objectives. Caterina remains with him. Then, for the future, we'll see.

Cast 
Sergio Castellitto as Libero Burro
Margaret Mazzantini as Caterina Clavarino 
Michel Piccoli as Uncle Toni
Chiara Mastroianni as Rosa Agnello
Robert Hundar as  Tito
Giovanni Visentin as Dr. Raffaele Pomba
Gian Fabio Bosco as Mario Agnello
 Bruno Armando as Gaetano Novaro

See also    
 List of Italian films of 1999

References

External links

1999 films
1999 comedy films
1999 directorial debut films
Films directed by Sergio Castellitto
Italian comedy films
1990s Italian films